Bernhard Münz (1 February 1856 – 17 December 1919) was an Austrian writer, philosopher, and librarian.

Biography
He was born in Leipnik (now Lipník, Czech Republic) to Jewish parents Johanna and Jakob Münz. His younger brother was journalist .

Münz studied classical philology and philosophy at the Universities of Vienna, Innsbruck, and Munich, completing a Ph.D. at the former in 1877 under the supervision of Franz Brentano. After working briefly at the university library in Graz, he became in 1889 amanuensis in the library of the Israelitische Kultusgemeinde Wien, and succeeded Samuel Hammerschlag as its director in 1900.

He wrote magazine articles for various publications, including Ost und West, the Allgemeine Zeitung des Judentums, the Neue Freie Presse, and Deutschland. He promoted Salomon Wininger's project of compiling a Jewish national biography and was on the editorial board from 1915; the first volume appeared in 1925. He was vice president of the journalists' and writers' association Concordia and did much to build up the association's charitable work for widows and orphans.

Publications

References
 

1856 births
1919 deaths
19th-century Austrian Jews
19th-century philosophers
20th-century Austrian philosophers
Austrian Empire Jews
Austrian librarians
Austrian philosophers
Burials at the Vienna Central Cemetery
Jewish philosophers
Jews and Judaism in Vienna
Ludwig Maximilian University of Munich alumni
People from Lipník nad Bečvou
University of Innsbruck alumni
University of Vienna alumni
Writers from Vienna